Tethylamna is an extinct genus of mackerel sharks that lived during the Eocene. It contains one valid species, T. dunni, and another potential species, T. twiggsensis. Its fossils have been found in North America, South America, Africa, and Asia. T. twiggsensis has also been assigned to Brachycarcharias.

References

Prehistoric shark genera
Prehistoric Lamniformes
Eocene sharks